
Gmina Grodziczno is a rural gmina (administrative district) in Nowe Miasto County, Warmian-Masurian Voivodeship, in northern Poland.

Villages
Gmina Grodziczno contains the villages and settlements of Białobłoty, Boleszyn, Grodziczno, Jakubkowo, Katlewo, Kowaliki, Kuligi, Linowiec, Lorki, Montowo, Mroczenko, Mroczno, Nowe Grodziczno, Ostaszewo, Rynek, Świniarc, Trzcin, Zajączkowo and Zwiniarz.

Neighbouring gminas
Gmina Grodziczno is bordered by the gminas of Brzozie, Kurzętnik, Lidzbark, Lubawa, Nowe Miasto Lubawskie and Rybno.

References

 Polish official population figures 2006

Grodziczno
Nowe Miasto County